Carex filipes, also known as Fishing-rod-like sedge or papillose sedge is a tussock-forming species of perennial sedge in the family Cyperaceae. It is native to Japan and southern parts of China.

See also
List of Carex species

References

filipes
Taxa named by Adrien René Franchet
Taxa named by Ludovic Savatier
Plants described in 1878
Flora of Japan
Flora of China